{{DISPLAYTITLE:AC0}}
AC0 is a complexity class used in circuit complexity.  It is the smallest class in the AC hierarchy, and consists of all families of circuits of depth O(1) and polynomial size, with unlimited-fanin AND gates and OR gates (we allow NOT gates only at the inputs).  It thus contains NC0, which has only bounded-fanin AND and OR gates.

Example problems
Integer addition and subtraction are computable in AC0, but multiplication is not (specifically, when the inputs are two integers under the usual binary or base-10 representations of integers).

Since it is a circuit class, like P/poly, AC0 also contains every unary language.

Descriptive complexity
From a descriptive complexity viewpoint, DLOGTIME-uniform AC0 is equal to the descriptive class FO+BIT of all languages describable in first-order logic with the addition of the BIT predicate, or alternatively by FO(+, ×), or by Turing machine in the logarithmic hierarchy.

Separations
In 1984 Furst, Saxe, and Sipser showed that calculating the parity of the input bits (unlike the aforementioned addition/subtraction problems above which had two inputs) cannot be decided by any AC0 circuits, even with non-uniformity.
It follows that AC0 is not equal to NC1, because a family of circuits in the latter class can compute parity.  More precise bounds follow from switching lemma.  Using them, it has been shown that there is an oracle separation between the polynomial hierarchy and PSPACE.

References

Circuit complexity
Complexity classes